The Oratory of Our Mother of Perpetual Help is a traditional Catholic chapel operating independently of the Diocese of San Jose.

External links
 Oratory of Our Mother of Perpetual Help
 SSPX Takeover of Independent Chapel Is Foiled

Roman Catholic churches in California
Churches in Santa Clara County, California
Buildings and structures in Santa Clara, California
Roman Catholic chapels in the United States